The International Baccalaureate Middle Years Programme (MYP) is an educational programme for students between the ages of 11 to 16 around the world as part of the International Baccalaureate (IB) continuum. Middle Year Programme is intended to prepare students for the two-year IB Diploma Programme.

It is used by 1,358 schools in 108 countries. It has been available since 1994. It was updated in 2014 and called MYP:New chapter.

In the Middle Year Programme students are required to receive instruction in all eight subject groups; Language Acquisition, Language and Literature, Individuals and Societies, Sciences, Mathematics, Arts, Physical and Health Education, and Design.

Overview

In 2014 the International Baccalaureate Organisation introduced a new more flexible programme for the middle years, which was then called the MYP:Next Chapter but this by 2019 had transitioned into MYP. It was possible to embed local curriculum in the framework. The full strategy involve approaches to learning strategy, concept-driven teaching and the global context strategy, and school organisation with collective planning, vertical structuring and cooperation with the community.

In order to officially participate in an official IB Middle Years Programme, students must attend an authorised IB World School. In the U.S., the MYP is often taught throughout middle school and the first two years of high school. Typically, middle schools and high schools work in coordination with each other.

A student receives at least 50 hours of instruction per year in each of eight subject groups each year though certain flexibility is permitted to reduce this to six during the final two years.The full programme lasts five years although shorter programmes, of two, three, or four years, could be negotiated in 2016.

Learner profile
At the centre of the MYP is the IB Learner Profile, which defines the type of students all the IB programmes (Primary Years Programme (PYP), Middle Years Programme (MYP), and Diploma Programme (DP)) are intended to develop. They are:

Caring
Balanced
Open-minded
Knowledgeable
Communicators
Risk-takers
Principled
Reflective
Inquirers
Thinkers

Global Contexts
There are six Global Contexts (GCs) which are applied to every course the student takes. They are designed to help students recognize the connection between what they learn in the classroom and the world around them, to tie the various subject areas together, and eventually to help students "see knowledge as an interrelated, coherent whole."

The Global Contexts should be linked to every topic taught in class and every assessment they set.

The Global Contexts are as follows:

 identities and relationships
 personal and cultural identity
 orientations in space and time
 scientific and technical innovation
 fairness and development
 globalisation and sustainability

Community service
A core part of IB MYP is community service. The community and service area requires students to study and perform community studies and service throughout the programme.

For example, in the United States, some schools and districts, like the Upper St. Clair School District and Montgomery County Public Schools (Maryland) either require or highly encourage a set number of hours of community service to be completed by each student, while schools like Charlotte-Mecklenburg Schools and Round Rock Independent School District require students to complete the "Community Project" for students to complete the programme during Year 3 or 4.

Personal Project
The "Personal Project" is meant to be a culmination of student learning, with a focus of the areas of interaction. Just as with the extended essay in the IB Diploma Programme, students are required to choose an academic or non-academic topic or subject for their project, which they are expected to complete over the course of the school year. Students are required to keep a personal journal while working on the process, and schedule regular meetings with an MYP teacher who will serve as their adviser throughout the year; in addition, a final reflection must be written upon the completion of the project which explains how it ties in with at least one of the Global Contexts. To get the MYP certificate, the candidate must get at least 3 out of 7 in the final score.

Curricular framework
The programme is based on the six global contexts. They are not generally taught as separate courses, but rather as themes that are reflected in all eight subject groups.

In addition to these eight subject groups, in MYP year 5, students complete the long-term project (the personal project) on a topic of their choice, with teacher supervision (which is graded on  separate criteria). Students in MYP year 3-4 complete the community project.

Subject groups
The subjects taught in the MYP are divided into eight subject groups.
{|class= "wikitable 
!Name in 2020
! (before 2014)
|-
|Language and Literature    
|Language A
|-
|Language Acquisition      
|Language B
|-
|Integrated Humanities (Individuals and Societies)
|Humanities
|-
|Sciences
|Sciences
|-
|Mathematics
|Mathematics
|-
|Arts
|Arts
|-
|Physical and Health Education    
|Physical Education
|-
|Design                     
|Technology
|}

Schools can choose the subjects they teach within each subject group and how many. However, each subject group must receive a minimum of 50 hours of curriculum time each academic year. In years 4 and 5, schools can request to only require students to receive 50 hours of instruction in six of the eight subject groups.

A student could take another "Language and Literature" course if they have sufficient proficiency in both (In MYP years 4&5 this could replace the Language Acquisition course). Schools are given much flexibility to allow them to introduce subjects they consider important and organize their own student assessment and reporting procedures.

However, the MYP gives clear criteria for each subject group. The criteria get progressively harder with the first year of MYP using the MYP 1 criteria set, then the second and third year using the MYP 3 criteria set and finally the last two years using the MYP 5 criteria set.  Each year, MYP students participate in one interdisciplinary activity that combines at least two of the subject groups; there is a separate criteria set for interdisciplinary learning.

IB MYP Certificate (Optional)
The MYP Certificate is the formal internationally recognised award related to the MYP. The MYP eAssessments are the form of the optional external moderation introduced in 2016. To receive the MYP Certificate, each candidate must complete at least one eAssessment in each of these areas:
 Language and literature
 Individuals and societies
 Sciences
 Mathematics
 Interdisciplinary learning
 Language acquisition (or second Language and literature)
 Physical and health education, Arts, or Design
 The MYP Personal project
Within each area, the subject with the highest score, on the scale of 1 to 7 is counted, the results will be tallied to create a total out of 56. The pass mark is 28 and the candidate must meet the Service and Actions requirements set by the school.

Assessment criteria
Each subject group uses four criteria to mark a student's ability in the subject. At the end of the year, teachers give a final score, out of eight, on each criterion based on the student's performance throughout the whole year. 
{| class="wikitable"
! colspan="2" |MYP:Next chapter grade boundaries
|-
!Total Criteria Levels
!Grade
|-
|1-5
|1
|-
|6-9
|2
|-
|10-14
|3
|-
|15-18
|4
|-
|19-23
|5
|-
|24-27
|6
|-
|28-32
|7
|}
The scores of the four criteria are added up and converted to a grade out of seven. This grade is meant to demonstrate the student's overall ability in the subject, with 1 being the lowest achievement and 7 the highest achievement.

Language and Literature
 A: Analysing
 B: Organizing
 C: Producing Text
 D: Using Language
Language Acquisition
 A: Comprehending spoken and visual text
 B: Comprehending written and visual text
 C: Communicating in response to spoken and/or written and/or visual text
 D: Using language in spoken and/or written form
Individuals and Societies
 A: Knowing and Understanding
 B: Investigating
 C: Communicating
 D: Thinking Critically
Sciences
 A: Knowing and Understanding
 B: Inquiring and Designing
 C: Processing and Evaluating
 D: Reflecting on the Impacts of Science
Mathematics
 A: Knowing and Understanding
 B: Investigating Patterns
 C: Communicating
 D: Applying Mathematics in Real-Life Contexts
The Arts
 A: Knowing and Understanding
 B: Developing Skills
 C: Thinking Creatively
 D: Responding
Physical and Health Education
 A: Knowing and Understanding
 B: Planning for Performance
 C: Applying and Performing
 D: Reflecting and Improving Performance
Design 
 A:  Inquiring and Analysing
 B: Developing Ideas
 C: Creating the Solution
 D: Evaluating
Interdisciplinary learning
 A: Disciplinary Grounding
 B: Synthesizing
 C: Communicating
 D: Reflecting
Personal Project
 A: Investigating
 B: Planning
 C: Taking action
 D: Reflecting

History and Development of the IB Middle Years Program
The Middle Years Program was developed significantly later than the Diploma Programme, and in parallel to and independently of what would become the Primary Years Programme. The Middle Years Programme's "birthplace" is considered to be the International School Moshi, in Tanzania, today known as the United World College East Africa, which had been the first school to introduce the IB diploma to the African continent. In the late 1970s the school identified a pedagogical disconnect stemming from teaching the British O-levels curriculum to students aged 11-16, and then the International Baccalaureate Diploma for students 16-18. The headmaster at the time, Lister Hannah, led discussions on the potential of developing a new two year pre-IB curriculum at the Association of International Schools in Africa conference in Nairobi in October 1978. Hannah, together with the heads of the International School of Lusaka, Zambia, and the International School of Tanganyika in Dar es Salaam, Tanzania, engaged in discussions with the International Baccalaureate Organization and the International Schools Association (ISA) about establishing a new pre-IB programme. In 1980, the school hosted a conference of the International Schools Association (ISA) in Moshi, titled 'The Needs of the Child in the Middle Years of Schooling (ages 11-16)'. This conference recommended the development of a course to meet the needs of students aged 11-16 years, with a focus on six key ‘needs’, which were described as Global, Intellectual, Personal, Physical, Creative, and Social.

Further workshops and conferences (Lusaka in 1981, New York in 1981, Wersen in 1981, London in 1982, and Cyprus in 1983) brought additional schools into the conversation, including the International School of Geneva (Ecolint), the United Nations International School (UNIS) in New York, and the Vienna International School, and established a framework for what would become the ISA curriculum (ISAC), and later the Middle Years Programme. It was during this time that Gérard Renaud, previously a teacher at Ecolint and then Director General of the IB, and Robert Belle-Isle, who was the director at UNIS and had previously been the superintendent of the Chambly school district in Quebec, became involved in the initiative.

From 1983-1990 the discussions crystalized into a five-year curriculum for students aged 11–16, rather than a purely pre-IB course. At the 1987 ISA annual conference in Svendborg, it was decided to pilot the newly designed curriculum. Three schools took part in the initial pilot: the MacDonald Cartier High School in Quebec, Canada (in Belle-Isle's former school district of Chambly); Het Rijnlands Lyceum in the Netherlands; and St Catherine’s School in Buenos Aires, Argentina. The Vienna International School joined soon after, and other school boards in Quebec became interested in the program at MacDonald Cartier, and around 20 schools soon began implementing the experimental program.

The ISAC programme was taken over by the International Baccalaureate Organization in the early 1990s, officially becoming the IB Middle Years Programme in 1994.

Discussion

Evidence of benefit
The Chicago Tribune reported that in 1998 in that city's Beverly area, only 67 students in the 8th grade chose to attend a local public high school offering an IB curriculum. When a cluster of Beverly schools introduced the IB Middle Years Programme in the 1999–2000 school year, the number of 8th graders who chose to attend the local high school then increased to about 150. One student was quoted, "I had really good teachers in the IB."

References

External links
 Middle Years Programme MYP:From Principles into Practice (2014) Full description of the MYP on the cusp of introduction of MYP:Next Chapter
 The Middle Years Programme Official website

International Baccalaureate